La scala di seta  (The Silken Ladder or Die seidene Leiter) is an operatic farsa comica in one act by Gioachino Rossini to a libretto by Giuseppe Maria Foppa.  It was first performed in Venice, Italy, at the Teatro San Moisè on 9 May 1812. The overture has been frequently recorded and continues to be featured in the modern concert repertoire.

From 1810 to 1813, the young Rossini composed four Italian farse, beginning with La cambiale di matrimonio (The Bill of Marriage), his first opera, and ending with Il Signor Bruschino.  These types of short pieces were popular in Venice at the end of the 18th century and the beginning of the 19th century.  The pieces were intimate, with a cast of five to seven singers, always including a pair of lovers, at least two comic parts, and one or two other minor roles.  The style called for much visual comedy improvised by the players.  As compared to many genres of opera, acting and comedic talent is more important relative to the required singing ability.  Rossini’s farces also have a significant sentimental element.

Roles

Synopsis
Time: 18th Century
Place: Paris

Dormont is the teacher and guardian of the beautiful Giulia, and he is determined that she will marry Blansac despite her continual rejection of his advances. The fact is that Giulia is already married to Blansac’s friend Dorvil, who every night is able to exercise his conjugal rights because Giulia lowers a ladder made of silk down to him from her bedroom window.

The opera opens in the morning. Owing to the attentions of Giulia’s cousin Lucilla, and the family servant, Germano, Dorvil has great difficulty making his escape by his usual method. Blansac is due to arrive at any minute in his quest to win Giulia’s love, but she has devised a scheme to divert his amorous attentions towards her cousin, who would make an excellent wife for him.

Giulia intends to bring Lucilla and Blansac together, and persuades Germano to spy on them from a secret hiding place to see how the relationship develops. Blansac arrives with his good friend Dorvil, who desperately tries to persuade him that Giulia is not looking for a husband. Unfortunately this only has the effect of making Blansac more determined, and more confident of success. He suggests that Dorvil might care to hide and see how successfully he is able to woo Giulia. Consequently, when Giulia enters, her meeting with Blansac is being overhead by both Germano and by her husband.

Giulia decides to probe Blansac to see if he would make a good and faithful husband for her cousin. Her questioning deceives all of the men listening into thinking that she is genuinely interested in Blansac. Dorvil emerges from hiding and storms off in fury, much to Germano’s surprise, who also shows himself. In the midst of all the confusion and noise Lucilla enters and Blansac suddenly notices what a fine looking young woman she is. Decidedly prettier than her cousin Giulia.

It is now late evening. Giulia is desperate for Dorvil to arrive so that she can explain the reason why she was questioning Blansac so closely about marriage. Once again the servant Germano is on hand and realizes that his mistress has an assignation. He can only assume that it is with Blansac, and decides to hide once more and see what happens. Unfortunately he is unable to keep his secret to himself and he lets Lucilla in on it. She is distressed to learn that Blansac, who she now loves dearly, is meeting Giulia and she also determines to find a hiding place in Giulia’s bedroom to observe proceedings.

There is general surprise and joyful amazement when it is Dorvil who climbs into the bedroom, followed closely by his friend who is intent on using the silken ladder to further his wooing, not of Giulia, but Lucilla. Everyone scatters when Dormont, who has been woken by all the noise, enters in his nightshirt. Seeing the way that everything has turned out for the best, he quickly forgives the couples for their underhand behavior and all ends in general rejoicing.

Recordings

References
Notes

Sources
Harewood, Earl of and Antony Peattie,(Eds.)(1997) The New Kobbe's Opera Book London, Ebury Press. 
Gossett, Philip; Brauner, Patricia (2001), "La scala di seta" in Holden, Amanda (ed.), The New Penguin Opera Guide, New York: Penguin Putnam. 
Osborne, Charles (1994), The Bel Canto Operas of Rossini, Donizetti, and Bellini, London: Methuen; Portland, Oregon: Amadeus Press.  
 Osborne, Richard (1986), Rossini (Dent Master Musicians series), (Ed.) Stanley Sadie. London: The Orion Publishing Group, 1986. J. M. Dent, 1993 
Osborne, Richard (1998), "La scala di seta", in  Stanley Sadie, (Ed.),  The New Grove Dictionary of Opera'', Vol. Four. p. 198. London: Macmillan Publishers, Inc.

External links
  Libretto
La scala di seta page
Background information about Rossini farces

Operas by Gioachino Rossini
Italian-language operas
Farse
1812 operas
One-act operas
Operas